"Next to You" is a song by the Finnish DJ Darude, featuring Elena Mady on vocals. It was released on 11 April 2003 as the second and final single from his second studio album, Rush (2003). The song was his third number-one single on Suomen virallinen lista.

Commercial performance 
"Next To You" debuted at number one on the Finnish singles chart, but it only stayed four weeks in the chart. It also failed to reach other charts.

Track listing
Finnish release only

CD

Charts

Weekly charts

See also

List of number-one singles (Finland)

References

External links
 "Next to You" at Discogs

Darude songs
2003 singles
2003 songs
Number-one singles in Finland